A "V" device is a metal  capital letter "V" with serifs which, when worn on certain decorations awarded by the United States Armed Forces, distinguishes an award for heroism or valor in combat instead of for meritorious service or achievement.

The decorations with which a "V" may be authorized differ among the military services, as well as the manner in which the "V" is worn and the name by which it is referred to. Until 2017, each service also used different criteria in determining whether a "V" could be authorized.

Etymology
The Department of Defense, Army, and Air Force refer to the "V" as the "V" device.  The Coast Guard refers to it as the Valor Device, while the Navy and Marine Corps refer to it as the Combat Distinguishing Device or Combat "V". When referring to a medal that has been awarded with the "V" device, it is often referred to as having been awarded "with valor".

History 

On 22 December 1945, in War Department Circular 383, the United States Army decided to introduce the "V" device to distinguish the award of a Bronze Star Medal for acts of valor and heroism, rather than meritorious service. Soldiers, including Army airmen, who were awarded the Bronze Star Medal for heroism in combat were now authorized to wear a bronze "V" on the suspension and service ribbon of the medal. Only one "V" was allowed to be worn on a ribbon. The Department of the Navy introduced the "V" as the "Combat Distinguishing Device", and on 15 February 1946, authorized the "V" device to be worn on the Legion of Merit and Bronze Star Medal for services or acts performed in actual combat with the enemy; in February 1947, this was changed to acts or services involving direct participation in combat operations.
Most World War II veterans who were entitled to the "V" probably did not know about or apply for the device, since large-scale separations from the services were taking place after the war ended. Stocks of the device also were not available for issue for at least a year after the issuance of the Army circular.

To be worn on a decoration, the "V" device must have been specifically authorized in the written award citation issued with the medal.  In 1996, the "V" device garnered public attention after the suicide of Admiral Jeremy Boorda, who was the Chief of Naval Operations. The news media reported that his death by suicide may have been caused by a Navy investigation following a story by Newsweek about Boorda wearing two "combat valor pins" on the service ribbons of his uniform, which he received for duty as a weapons officer and executive officer aboard two naval ships off the coast of Indochina during the Vietnam War. Although there were indications these "combat distinguishing devices" were authorized to be worn on his Navy Commendation Medal and Navy Achievement Medal, the Department of the Navy Board For Correction of Naval Records determined after his death that both of the devices were not authorized to be worn on the two decorations.

In 2011, the Department of Defense changed its awards manual regulations concerning the Medal of Honor (MOH), specifying that the "V" device instead of the oak leaf cluster and  inch star would be used to denote additional citations in the rare event of a service member being awarded a second MOH. By May 2015, the Department of Defense changed its awards manual again concerning the MOH, specifying that a separate MOH is presented to an individual for each succeeding act that justifies an award. There has not been a living repeat MOH recipient since the World War I era, so the "V" device has never actually been worn in this fashion.

Until 2017, the criteria and conditions under which the "V" device could be awarded differed among the services. For the Army, the "V" was worn solely to denote "participation in acts of heroism involving conflict with an armed enemy". For the Navy, Marine Corps, and Coast Guard, the "V" could be worn to denote combat heroism, or to recognize individuals who were "exposed to personal hazard during direct participation in combat operations". For the Air Force, the "V" could be worn on the Bronze Star Medal to denote heroism in combat, but also on the Commendation Medal and Achievement Medal to denote heroism or for being "placed in harm's way" during contingency deployment operations.

Prior to 1 January 2014, the device was also authorized on Outstanding Unit Awards and Organizational Excellence Awards to indicate the unit participated in direct combat support actions. The "V" device is also authorized for the Air Medal by all the services where heroism in aerial combat was involved on an individual mission. On 15 August 2016, the Coast Guard changed their criteria such that new awards of the "V" would be for valor only, to denote a heroic act or acts while participating in conflict or combat with an armed enemy. On 6 January 2016, the Department of Defense announced that it was revising its military decorations and awards program to include a "V" device change to its original 1940s use of denoting heroism in combat only on specific decorations for the military services. Two new "C" and "R" devices will also be used on relevant awards.

Device changes
On 2 February 2017, new silver-plated and gold-plated "V" devices were introduced, followed by wreathed versions in September which led to speculation that the various versions of the "V" device would now indicate how many times a specific medal was awarded with the "V." The U.S. Air Force uniform regulations update of 15 April 2019, was the first to describe and depict the new "V" devices as follows:

On 21 December 2016, the "V" device ceased being authorized for Achievement Medals. Retroactive to January 2016, the "V" device ceased being authorized for the Legion of Merit, being replaced by the "C" device.

Decorations eligible for the "V" device 
Currently, the following decorations of the United States Armed Forces are eligible to be awarded with a "V" device.

Army and Air Force 
For the Army and the Air Force, the "V" is positioned to the right of any bronze or silver oak leaf clusters from the wearer's perspective, or positioned in the center of the service ribbon if worn alone.

Only 4 devices may be worn per ribbon; an additional ribbon is worn to the wearer's left when necessary to support additional devices:

Navy, Marine Corps, and Coast Guard 
For the Navy, Marine Corps, and Coast Guard, the "V" is always worn in the center of the service ribbon, while any gold or silver  Inch Stars are added in balance to the right and left of the "V" starting with the right side from the wearer's perspective. Marine Corps refer to it as Combat Distinguishing Device.
The Navy, Marine Corps, and Coast Guard continue to award and issue the bronze version. The Marine Corps allows anodized medals and anodized Combat "V"s to be worn on the dress blues uniform.

Combined with Arabic numerals 
Golden or brass Arabic numerals may be used to indicate the total number of times the medal was awarded if the total number of devices, of any types, exceed 4 total devices and would thus not fit on a single ribbon.

Notable recipients 

Brett Blanton, Architect of the Capitol
Eddie Albert, actor and activist
Richard Lee Armitage, US Deputy Secretary of State
Monica Beltran
Michael Boorda, 25th Chief of Naval Operations
Jim Bridenstine, US Representative
Maurice Britt, NFL football player
William B. Caldwell III
Duane Carey, NASA astronaut
Christopher Cassidy, NASA astronaut
Llewellyn Chilson
Max Cleland, US Senator
Dan Crenshaw, US Representative
Paris Davis, former Commander of the 10th Special forces
Ray Davis, 14th Asst Commandant of the Marine Corps
Bob Dole, US Senator
Desmond Doss
Joseph Dunford, 19th Chairman of the Joint Chiefs of Staff 
Michael Fahey, Mayor of Omaha
Kenneth Raymond Fleenor, Mayor of Selma, Texas
Ronald Fogleman, 15th Chief of Staff of the Air Force
Tommy Franks, Commander of the US Central Command
William J. Gainey
Joseph L. Galloway, newspaper correspondent and columnist
Bill Genaust
Calvin Graham, youngest US serviceman to serve and fight during World War II, at 12 years of age
Mark Green, US Representative
William Guarnere
David H. Hackworth, journalist
Michael Hagee, 33rd Commandant of the Marine Corps 
Alexander Haig, US Secretary of State
John Harllee
Gustav Hasford, novelist, journalist and poet
Michael Hayden, Director of the CIA
Ira Hayes
Joseph P. Hoar, Commander in Chief of US Central Command
Charles T. Horner Jr.
Robert L. Howard
Zach Iscol, entrepreneur, candidate in the 2021 New York City Comptroller election
Jack H. Jacobs, military analyst and investment manager
Richard Jadick
Sam Johnson, US Representative
James L. Jones, 32nd Commandant of the Marine Corps 
Woodrow Keeble
John Kerry, US Secretary of State
Harry Kizirian
Charles C. Krulak, 31st Commandant of the Marine Corps 
Victor H. Krulak, author
Chris Kyle, Navy Seal Sniper
Douglas MacArthur, five-star general
Richard Marcinko, 1st commanding officer of Seal Team Six
Lee Marvin, actor
John McCain, US Senator
Michael A. Monsoor
Robert Mueller, Director of the FBI
Audie Murphy, actor, songwriter, and rancher
Raymond L. Murray
John P. Murtha, US Representative
Peter Pace, 16th Chairman of the Joint Chiefs of Staff
David Petraeus, Director of the CIA
Chance Phelps
Chesty Puller
Charles B. Rangel, US Representative
L. Scott Rice
Matthew Ridgway, 19th Chief of Staff of the US Army
John Ripley
Norman Schwarzkopf, Commander of US Central Command
Sidney Shachnow
Hugh Shelton, 14th Chairman of the Joint Chiefs of Staff 
David M. Shoup, 22nd Commandant of the Marine Corps
Arthur D. Simons
Jamie Smith
Clifton Sprague World War II admiral, commander of Task Unit 77 during the Battle off Samar
Robert L. Stewart, NASA astronaut
Earl E. Stone, 1st Director of the Armed Forces Security Agency, the predecessor of the National Security Agency
Oliver Stone
Jeff Struecker
Keni Thomas, country music singer
Strom Thurmond, US Senator
Matt Urban
John William Vessey Jr., 10th Chairman of the Joint Chiefs of Staff
Alejandro Villanueva, NFL football player
Raúl G. Villaronga, Mayor of Killeen, Texas
Larry D. Welch, 12th Chief of Staff of the US Air Force
Allen West, US Representative
Chuck Yeager, first pilot confirmed to have exceeded the speed of sound in level flight
Elmo R. Zumwalt Jr., 19th Chief of Naval Operations

See also 

Awards and decorations of the United States military
United States military award devices

Notes

References 

Devices and accouterments of United States military awards
1945 establishments in the United States